Dongfu may refer to the following locations in China:

 Dongfu, Fujian (东富镇), town in Haicang District, Xiamen
 Dongfu, Hunan (东富镇), town in Liling